My Kopi-O! is an Indonesian coffee company and coffeehouse chain based in Surabaya, East Java. My Kopi-O! was founded by Darma Santoso on 16 August 2010 and the first coffeeshop outlet was opened in Townsquare Surabaya.

Products 
The coffee used by My Kopi-O! are Sapan Toraja variants of Arabica coffee, Pangalengan Arabica Malabar, Arabian Cloud and Flores Robusta Manggarai.

My Kopi-O! food consists of mainstream European cuisine, East Asian cuisine, Malaysian cuisine and Indonesian cuisine. My Kopi-O beverages include Kopitiam, European-style Coffee, desserts, smoothies, and others.

Outlets 
Numbers of My Kopi-O! outlets and its subsidiaries as 30 March 2019.

See also 

 List of coffeehouse chains

References

External links 

 My Kopi-O! official website
 My Kopi-O! blog

Food and drink companies of Indonesia
Food and drink companies established in 2010
Restaurants established in 2010
Indonesian brands
2010 establishments in Indonesia
Companies based in Surabaya
Surabaya
Coffee in Indonesia